Bebearia paludicola, the swamp palm forester, is a butterfly in the family Nymphalidae. It is found in Sierra Leone, Ivory Coast, Ghana, Nigeria, Cameroon, Equatorial Guinea, the Republic of the Congo, the Central African Republic and the Democratic Republic of the Congo. The habitat consists of swampy areas in forests.

The larvae feed on Calamus deerratus.

Subspecies
Bebearia paludicola paludicola (Nigeria, Cameroon, Equatorial Guinea, Congo, Central African Republic)
Bebearia paludicola blandi Holmes, 2001 (Sierra Leone, Ivory Coast, Ghana)

References

Butterflies described in 2001
paludicola